Vernonia acaulis is a species of perennial plant from family Asteraceae. It is native to the U.S.A.

References 

acaulis

Flora of Florida
Flora of Georgia (U.S. state)
Flora of South Carolina
Flora of North Carolina